This article is a list of diseases of trees in the genus Platanus (plane trees, also known in North America as sycamores).

Bacterial diseases

Fungal diseases

Miscellaneous diseases or disorders

Nematodes, parasitic

References
Diseases of Sycamore (Platanus spp.), The American Phytopathological Society

Platanus
Platanus
Tree diseases